Hradešice is a municipality and village in Klatovy District in the Plzeň Region of the Czech Republic. It has about 400 inhabitants. The historic centre of the village is well preserved and is protected by law as a village monument zone.

Administrative parts
Villages of Černíč and Smrkovec are administrative parts of Hradešice.

Gallery

References

Villages in Klatovy District